Douglas Burns "Doug" Kimbell (born June 22, 1960, in Long Beach, California) is a former USA National Team water polo player who won the silver medal for the United States at the 1988 Summer Olympics in Seoul, South Korea.  He was also a member of the USA Water Polo team at the 1992 Summer Olympics, which finished fourth in Barcelona, Spain.

Kimbell graduated from Villa Park High School in 1978 and still holds many of the school's swimming and water polo scoring records.  He attended UCLA briefly on an athletic scholarship, transferring to Santa Ana College (SAC) and then completing his collegiate career at California State University, Long Beach (CSULB).  He is a member of the Athletic Hall of Fame for both CSULB and SAC. In 2000, Kimbell was inducted into the USA Water Polo Hall of Fame.

Kimbell is 6'9", married to Darlene Slepcevic Kimbell and the father to a son Jackson,  born in 1994, and a daughter McKenna, born in 2008.

See also
 List of Olympic medalists in water polo (men)

References

External links
 

1960 births
Living people
American male water polo players
Olympic silver medalists for the United States in water polo
Water polo players at the 1988 Summer Olympics
Sportspeople from Long Beach, California
Place of birth missing (living people)
Medalists at the 1988 Summer Olympics
Water polo players at the 1995 Pan American Games
Pan American Games gold medalists for the United States
Medalists at the 1995 Pan American Games
Pan American Games medalists in water polo